ŠK Tomášov is a Slovak association football club located in Tomášov. It currently plays in 3. liga (3rd tier in Slovak football system). The club was founded in 1930.

Colors and badge 
Its colors are green and white.

References

External links 

 Futbalnet profile 
 Official club website 

Football clubs in Slovakia
1930 establishments in Czechoslovakia